The 1917 Swarthmore Quakers football team was an American football team that represented Swarthmore College as an independent during the 1917 college football season. The team compiled a 6–2 record and outscored opponents by a total of 238 to 40. Bill Roper was the head coach.

Schedule

References

Swarthmore
Swarthmore Garnet Tide football seasons
Swarthmore Quakers football